Stanislav Savvich Karakoz (born 20 October 1999) is a Russian football player.

Club career
He made his debut in the Russian Professional Football League for FC Chertanovo Moscow on 23 October 2016 in a game against FC Kaluga.

He made his Russian Football National League debut for Chertanovo on 10 November 2018 in a game against FC Armavir.

References

External links
 Profile by Russian Professional Football League

1999 births
Sportspeople from Sochi
Living people
Russian footballers
Russia youth international footballers
Association football defenders
FC Anzhi Makhachkala players
FC Chertanovo Moscow players
FC Olimp-Dolgoprudny players